Bartlett Yancey  (February 19, 1785 - August 30, 1828) was an American politician who was a U.S. congressman from North Carolina, United States, between 1813 and 1817. He was a member of the Democratic-Republican party.

Born near Yanceyville, North Carolina, Yancey attended Hyco Academy in Caswell County before enrolling at the University of North Carolina at Chapel Hill from 1804 to 1806. After studying in Hillsborough, North Carolina under Archibald Debow Murphey, Yancey was admitted to the North Carolina bar in 1807 and practiced law.

Yancey was elected to the 13th United States Congress in 1812 and re-elected in 1814 to the 14th Congress, serving from March 4, 1813 to March 3, 1817. During both terms, he chaired the Committee on Claims. Refusing to run for Congress again in 1816, Yancey instead ran for the North Carolina Senate and served there for ten years, from 1817 to 1827; he served as Speaker of the North Carolina Senate for his entire tenure in the legislature.

In 1825, Bartlett Yancey was offered the position of "Minister" to Peru. Today this position is called ambassador. While the offer formally was made by President John Quincy Adams, it was upon the recommendation of US Secretary of State Henry Clay, who served in that post 1825 to 1829. Yancey declined the offer.

In 1808, Bartlett Yancey married his first cousin Ann Graves (1786-1855), and the couple had ten children. No son of Bartlett Yancey had a son. Thus, this branch of the Yancey surname died out.

He died at his home ("Oakland") near Milton, North Carolina, in 1828, and is buried in the Yancey Family Cemetery in Yanceyville.

Yancey was a slave owner.

Named in his honor are: (1) the Town of Yanceyville (Caswell County, North Carolina); (2) Bartlett Yancey High School (in Yanceyville); and (3) Yancey County, North Carolina.

The Bartlett Yancey House in Yanceyville was added to the National Register of Historic Places in 1973.

References

External links

 Biography
 Caswell County History Website
 Caswell County Family Tree
 Caswell County Web Log
 Caswell County North Carolina GenWeb
 Caswell County Photograph Collection
 Caswell County Cemetery Census
 1810 Bartlett Yancey Letter
Caswell County Historic Sites

1785 births
1828 deaths
North Carolina state senators
People from Yanceyville, North Carolina
University of North Carolina at Chapel Hill alumni
Democratic-Republican Party members of the United States House of Representatives from North Carolina
19th-century American politicians